Title 41 of the United States Code, titled "Public Contracts," enacted on January 4, 2011, consists of federal statutes regarding public contracts in the United States Code.

 —General Provisions
 —Termination of War Contracts
 —Procurement of Supplies and Services by Armed Services
 —Procurement Procedures
 —Judicial Review of Administrative Decisions
 —Service Contract Labor Standards
 —Office of Federal Procurement Policy
 —Federal Grants and Cooperative Agreements
 —Contract Disputes
 —Drug-Free Workplace

Notes

External links
U.S. Code Title 41, via United States Government Printing Office
U.S. Code Title 41, via Cornell University

41
Title 41
Government procurement in the United States